This is a list of episodes of Mr. Bean: The Animated Series, a British animated comedy television series produced by Tiger Aspect Productions for ITV and CITV. It premiered on 5 January 2002.

In January 2014, CITV announced a revival of the series with Rowan Atkinson returning to the role as Mr. Bean as well as other cast members reprising their roles. 52 new episodes were broadcast from 16 February 2015 to 10 March 2016.

On 6 February 2018 CITV announced a fifth and final series of the show, which will feature a total of 26 episodes. Series 5 premiered on 9 April 2019 on CITV as well as on Turner channels worldwide.

Mostly, the first 3 series were dubbed as "Series 1", but the last 2 series were dubbed as "Series 2" and "Series 3".

Series overview

Episode list

Series 1 (2002)

Series 2 (2003)

Series 3 (2004)
Unlike the first two series, series 3 is the first to be broadcast daily on CITV rather than a Saturday night prime-time slot on ITV1 as well as the first to have 18 single episodes rather than back-to-back segments.

Series 4 (2015–16)
Following an 11-year hiatus, a fourth series consisting of 52 episodes begins broadcasting on 16 February 2015.

Special episode (2018)

Series 5 (2019)
Following yet another 3-year hiatus, a fifth series consisting of 26 episodes premiered on 9 April 2019 on CITV as well as on Turner channels worldwide. Unlike the past two series, it is the first since series 2 to have two 11-minute back-to-back segments than single episodes.

References

Lists of British animated television series episodes
Mr. Bean